Face to Face (Titled as Face 2 Face) is a 2012 Malayalam-language mystery thriller film directed by V. M. Vinu and starring Mammootty, Siddique, Kalabhavan Mani, Ragini Dwivedi, Roma Asrani and Firoz Khan. The film was written by Manoj Payyanur and produced by M. K. Nazar under the banner of Good Line Productions. It was released on 30 November 2012. This Film Was a Box Office Disaster.

Plot  
Balachandran is a suspended and honest cop, who lost his wife Jayasree and son because of his alcoholism. Balachandran is now working as a Real estate Businessman and living with his brother  and sister-in-Law Dr.Uma. Balachandran meets his childhood friend SP Ramdas and CI Abdul Lateef.

One Day, Balachandran finds out that Ex-Chief Minister Kuryan Punchakkadan's son Thomas is Murdered and hanged on a cross near a beach. Ramdas calls Balachandran to his office to enquire about Thomas's murder. He says that  he met Thomas at a hotel before his death. He even Reveals that Thomas is a known pimp, who is involved in sex racketing and human trafficking. He has a human trafficking partner named Nirmala Thankachi, a beautition. Their main place where they do their business is Pagoda Resort, Which is owned by a drug dealer named Nirmal Kumar. Thomas's cousin brother George is the supporter of Thomas's every dirty job. He tries to arrest Thomas but when he takes to the station his releasing order came. Thomas and George tries to kill him once with his and make it as an accident but Balachandran manages to escape. Balachandran helps Lateef to investigate Thomas's murder without Ramdas's knowledge.

One day he meets 4 rich youngsters, Chandu, Peter, Shyam and Rahul and befriends them. Balachandran take them to old estate. Soon a flashback occurs showing that Balachandran found out that they 4 killed Thomas in the estate and Balachandran was pretending to be friendly with them. He asks them why they killed Thomas. They reveals that they killed him as he raped and killed Peter's sister Isa. Balachandran reveals Chandu is Balachandran's son and hugged him. He tells to Ramdas that he kill Thomas and Balachandran gets arrested. Jayasree comes to meet him in jail and she said its all my fault, Then Balachandran said its not your fault, my alcoholism made it.

Cast

 Mammootty as CI Balachandran
 Siddique as SP T.Ramadas IPS
Balachandran's Childhood Friend and Well wisher
 Kalabhavan Mani as CI Abdul Latheef
 Ragini Dwivedi as Jayasree Balachandran
 Roma Asrani as Dr. Uma Antharjanam
Balachandran's Sister-in-Law
 Vineeth Kumar as Anwar (TV-Reporter)
Uma's husband
 Vijayaraghavan as Ex-Chief Minister Kuryan Varghese Punchakadan
Thomas Punchakkadan's Father
 Nishanth Sagar as George Punchakkadan
Thomas's cousin and friend
 Mamukkoya as Aalikkoya
Kuryan Varghese Punchakadan's Driver and Peter's Neighbour
 Mahesh as Raghuprasad
 Kunchan
 Rajesh Hebbar as Dr. Chandrababu
 Reena Basheer as Chandrababu's wife
 Amritha as Isa
Peter's Sister
 Firoz Khan as Thomas Punchakkadan
Kuryan's son and George's cousin
 Abu Salim
 Sivaji Guruvayoor as DGP Nandakishore Varma IPS
 Gayathri
 V.M Vinu as shop owner

Production
Roma Asrani and the Kannada actress Ragini Dwivedi played the lead roles along with Mammootty. The film had an ensemble cast of supporting actors including  Siddique, Vijayaraghavan, Kalabhavan Mani, Mamukkoya and Kunchan along with four new faces: Gautam, Rishikesh, Rohit and Binoy. The film was extensively shot in Goa, Ernakulam and Munnar.

According to the director, Face to Face is a "high-octane thriller woven around a murder mystery. The film brings on to the screen loads of action and suspense."

Soundtrack
The soundtrack features three songs composed by Alphons Joseph . The lyrics were written by  Anil Panachooran and Anna San Jaimt.

 Track list

Release and reception
The film was released in 81 theaters across Kerala on 30 November 2012; the movie had gained negative responses from both critics and viewers.

Sify gave the movie two stars out of five and stated this: "With the absence of basic logic at most times and a style that was perhaps okay eons ago, this film is tough to be digested even for the hardcore fans of" Mammootty.

The Times of India also gave the movie two stars and stated: "The film does not engage the audience. It is so much pre-occupied with an infuriating surge of self-pity and some stereo-typed villainy. Save for the perennial charm on his face, even Mammootty fails to salvage a shoddily-written plot."

Rediff.com's headline was "Face 2 Face is best avoided" and added, "None of these gimmicks can salvage the film because of its weak plot and over-dependence on star power. "

References

External links 
 
 Article

2012 films
2010s Malayalam-language films
Indian mystery thriller films
2010s mystery thriller films
Films shot in Goa
Films shot in Kochi
Films shot in Munnar
Films directed by V. M. Vinu